Little Creek is a 12.58 mile long river in Burlington County, New Jersey, United States. It drains into the Southwest Branch Rancocas Creek. Little Creek itself drains an area of 6.32 square miles. Little Creek has been found to be impaired for primary recreation, but safe and suitable for aquatic life. Little Creek drains mostly a suburban/rural area, and has been classified as a low-gradient stream.

Tributaries
Bear Swamp River

See also
List of rivers of New Jersey

References

Rivers of New Jersey
Rivers of Burlington County, New Jersey
Rivers in the Pine Barrens (New Jersey)